Tuichawng Legislative Assembly constituency is one of the 40 Legislative Assembly constituencies of Mizoram state in India.

It is part of Lawngtlai district and is reserved for candidates belonging to the Scheduled tribes. It was established, in 2008, by the Delimitation of Parliamentary and Assembly Constituencies Order, 2008.

Members of the Legislative Assembly

Election results

2018

See also
List of constituencies of the Mizoram Legislative Assembly
Lawngtlai district

References

Lawngtlai district
Assembly constituencies of Mizoram